Kete may refer to:

Places
 Kete, a junior Jüz in contemporary Kazakhstan

Other uses
 Kete (basket), traditional Māori baskets, normally woven from flax leaves
 Kete (surname), a surname (including a list of people with the name)
 Kete language
 Akete, drums used in Asante and Nyabinghi music
 , a United States Navy submarine